The Parent-Child Interaction Assessment-II Modifying Attributions of Parents (PCIA-II/MAP) intervention is a brief cognitive-behavioral manualized treatment for parents in high-risk families (Bohr, 2008, 2005, 2004a, 2004b; Bohr & Holigrocki, 2005). A parent and child are video recorded during a structured play activity (see PCIA-II; Holigrocki, Kaminski, & Frieswyk, 1999, 2002) and sessions involve the therapist and parent discussing excerpts from the video and conclude with a post-treatment assessment.

After filming the interaction, the clinical research team meets to review the video to identify areas of parenting strength and problematic behavior in the parent or child. Next, the parent meets with the therapist for four intervention sessions. Treatment is directed at helping the parent to develop parenting strengths and to identify and modify inaccurate, dysfunctional, or negative attributions. The intervention involves showing the parent the video recorded parent-child interaction. In each of the intervention sessions, the therapist points out parenting strengths, creates a dialogue about what the child may be thinking, feeling, and intending; and then elicits and discusses with the parent other possible attributions for the child's behavior. After the intervention sessions, the post-treatment meeting involves filming the dyad again and having parent complete a series of measures to assess treatment efficacy. 

The PCIA-II/MAP intervention is being used in treatment and outcome research in Ontario, Canada. A randomized controlled trial is in progress with women victims of partner violence in the USA.

See also
 Child psychotherapy

References 
 Bohr, Y. (2005). Infant Mental Health Programs: Experimenting with innovative models. Infant Mental Health Journal, 26(5), 407-422. 
 Bohr, Y. (2004, July). Play, attachment, and negative parental attributions: An innovative intervention. Workshop at the American Psychological Association Annual Convention, Honolulu, HI.
 Bohr, Y. (2004, June). Visits to the zoo and infant mental health: Experimenting with innovative models for treatment for the very young. Workshop at the Canadian Psychological Association Annual Convention, St. John's, Newfoundland, Canada.
 Bohr, Y., Dhayanandhan, B., Armour, L., Sockett DiMarco, N., Holigrocki, R. & Baumgartner, E. (2008). Mapping parent-infant interactions: A brief cognitive approach to the prevention of relationship ruptures and infant maltreatment (The MAP method). Infant Mental Health Promotion: IMPrint, 51, 2-7. 
 Bohr, Y. & Holigrocki, R. (2006, June). Modifying negative parental attributions through play: First step in preventing maltreatment? Poster presented at From Research to Practice: Society for Psychotherapy Research Annual Meeting, University of Edinburgh, Scotland.
 Bohr, Y. & Holigrocki, R. J. (2005). PCIA-II/MAP Treatment Manual: Modifying Attributions of Parents intervention. Unpublished manuscript, York University and the University of Indianapolis. 
 Holigrocki, R. J., Crain, R., Bohr, Y, & Young, K., Bensman, H. (2009). Interventional use of the Parent-Child Interaction Assessment-II enactments: Modifying an abused mother's attributions to her son. Journal of Personality Assessment, 91(5), 1-12.
 Holigrocki, R. J., Hudson Crain, R., Bohr, Y. & Young, K. (2006, March). When direct observation assessment becomes treatment: Modifying the negative attributions of women victims of domestic violence. In Constance T. Fischer (Chair), Collaborative Feedback. Paper presented at the Society for Personality Assessment Annual Meeting in San Diego, CA.
 Holigrocki, R. J., Hudson Crain, R., Bohr, Y, & Young, K., & Bensman, H. (in press). Interventional use of the Parent-Child Interaction Assessment-II enactments: Modifying an abused mother's attributions to her son. Journal of Personality Assessment.

External links
 PCIA-II/MAP: Link to external web site with full text articles and treatment manual

Cognitive therapy
Psychotherapies